John Greene "Tiny" Henderson (July 23, 1892 – after 1917) was a college football and baseball player and coach. He was from Ocilla, Georgia.

College football
Henderson was a lineman for the Georgia Bulldogs of the University of Georgia from 1912 to 1915. He weighed 210 pounds.

1913
In 1913 Henderson out weighed the second heaviest Georgia projected starter by 20 pounds.

1914
In 1914, he was "regarded as one of the best line men in the entire south" and worked "as fast with his head as with his feet." Henderson kicked the winning point to defeat Sewanee, giving the school its first loss at home since 1893. He passed the ball to All-American quarterback David Paddock.

1915
He was captain of the 1915 team. Henderson was elected All-Southern.  Henderson once was the head of a group of three men, one behind the other with his hands upon the shoulders of the one in front, to counter Georgia Tech's jump shift offense utilized by John Heisman. The game ended 0–0.

Baseball
He led Georgia baseball in 1917.

References

1892 births
Year of death missing
American football centers
American football tackles
Georgia Bulldogs baseball coaches
Georgia Bulldogs football players
All-Southern college football players
People from Ocilla, Georgia
Players of American football from Georgia (U.S. state)